Aemylurgis is a genus of moths of the family Yponomeutidae.

Species
Aemylurgis xanthoclina - Meyrick, 1936

References 

Yponomeutidae